Commelina africana, the common yellow commelina, is a widespread species of flowering plant in the family Commelinaceae. It is native to SubSaharan Africa, Madagascar, Réunion, and the Arabian Peninsula, and has been introduced to India. It is occasionally consumed as a leaf vegetable, and occasionally fed to rabbits and pigs.

Subtaxa
The following subtaxa are accepted:
Commelina africana subsp. africana
Commelina africana var. glabriuscula (Norl.) Brenan – Southern Africa, Rift Valley
Commelina africana var. karooica (C.B.Clarke) Govaerts – Namibia, Botswana, South Africa
Commelina africana var. krebsiana (Kunth) C.B.Clarke – Namibia, Botswana, South Africa, Mozambique, Zimbabwe, Comoros
Commelina africana var. lancispatha C.B.Clarke – Sierra Leone, eastern, central and southern Africa
Commelina africana var. milleri Brenan – Namibia, Botswana, Northern Provinces, Zimbabwe, Zambia, Malawi, Kenya, Tanzania, Uganda 
Commelina africana var. villosior (C.B.Clarke) Brenan – Most of range
Commelina africana subsp. zanzibarica Faden – Kenya, Tanzania, and introduced to India

References

africana
Flora of West Tropical Africa
Flora of West-Central Tropical Africa
Flora of Northeast Tropical Africa
Flora of East Tropical Africa
Flora of South Tropical Africa
Flora of Southern Africa
Flora of Madagascar
Flora of Réunion
Flora of Saudi Arabia
Flora of Yemen
Taxa named by Carl Linnaeus
Plants described in 1753